Wujiang District may refer to:

 Wujiang District, Suzhou, Jiangsu, formerly Wujiang City
 Wujiang District, Shaoguan, Guangdong